Pisenor is a genus of African brushed trapdoor spiders first described by Eugène Simon in 1889.

Species
 it contains nine species:
Pisenor arcturus (Tucker, 1917) – Zimbabwe
Pisenor leleupi (Benoit, 1965) – Congo
Pisenor lepidus (Gerstäcker, 1873) – Tanzania
Pisenor macequece (Tucker, 1920) – Mozambique
Pisenor notius Simon, 1889 (type) – Ethiopia to Zimbabwe
Pisenor plicatus (Benoit, 1965) – Rwanda
Pisenor selindanus (Benoit, 1965) – Zimbabwe
Pisenor tenuistylus (Benoit, 1965) – Congo
Pisenor upembanus (Roewer, 1953) – Congo

References

Barychelidae
Mygalomorphae genera
Spiders of Africa
Taxa named by Eugène Simon